The 2014–15 St. John's Red Storm women's basketball team represented St. John's University during the 2014–15 NCAA Division I women's basketball season. The Red Storm were led by third-year head coach Joe Tartamella, played their games at Carnesecca Arena and were members of the Big East Conference. They finished the season 23–11, 11–7 in Big East play to finish in fourth place. They advanced to the semifinals of the Big East women's basketball tournament where they lost to Seton Hall. They were invited to the Women's National Invitation Tournament where they defeated Army in the first round, Fordham in the second round before losing to Big East member Villanova in the third round.

Roster

Schedule

|-
!colspan=9 style="background:#BA0C2F; color:#FFFFFF;"| Regular Season

|-
!colspan=9 style="background:#BA0C2F;"| Big East tournament

|-
!colspan=9 style="background:#BA0C2F;"| WNIT

Rankings

See also
 2014–15 St. John's Red Storm men's basketball team

References

St. John's
St. John's Red Storm women's basketball seasons
Saint John's
Saint John's